Kim Chol-jin (born October 31, 1978) is a North Korean weightlifter and Merited Athlete. Kim represented North Korea at the 2008 Summer Olympics in Beijing, where he competed for the men's lightweight category (69 kg). Kim placed sixth in this event, as he successfully lifted 146 kg in the single-motion snatch, and hoisted 180 kg in the two-part, shoulder-to-overhead clean and jerk, for a total of 326 kg.

Kim was coached by Han Kyong-thae and at one time he coached Kwon Yong-gwang.

References

External links
NBC 2008 Olympics profile

North Korean male weightlifters
1978 births
Living people
Olympic weightlifters of North Korea
Weightlifters at the 2008 Summer Olympics
20th-century North Korean people
21st-century North Korean people